Carolijn is a Dutch feminine given name. Notable people with this name include the following:

Carolijn Brouwer (born 1973), Dutch sailor 
Carolijn "Carolyn" Lilipaly (born 1969), Dutch news anchor and actress

See also

Carolin

Dutch feminine given names